Michael Jerome Corbitt (March 17, 1944 – July 27, 2004) was a police chief of Willow Springs, Illinois from 1973 until 1982, and an associate of Chicago Outfit mobsters such as Sal Bastone, Sam "Momo" Giancana and Antonino "Tony," "Joe Batters" Accardo. He became a cooperating witness after being convicted of aiding in the murder of Chicagoan Diane Masters, by her husband, Alan. Corbitt authored a book about his experiences entitled, Double Deal: The Cop Who Was a Mobster.

Life
Michael Corbitt was born to an Irish American family in Chicago, Illinois. After several years in a Roman Catholic parochial school, he was transferred to public school at age 9. He would later recall that, without a Catholic school uniform to hide behind, it was obvious just how poor his family was. Humiliated by the poverty of his parents and tired of hand-me-down toys and clothing, he turned to shoplifting and later graduated to running with an Italian-American street gang.

In always hanging around where Corbitt could be seen by Mob members, he soon drew the attention of the Chicago Outfit, who recruited him into running errands around one of its social clubs. After several years of owning and running a Sunoco gas station set up by the Mob, which also doubled as a mobster hang out, Outfit boss Sam Giancana then offered Corbitt a position as a police officer in Willow Springs, Illinois. According to Corbitt's memoirs, Giancana told him after he accepted the position, "But just remember kid...don't forget who your friends are." Shortly thereafter, Corbitt was sworn into the Willow Springs police department by notorious political boss Doc Rust.

Michael J. Corbitt died from lung cancer, at age 60, in 2004.

Quotes
 "In the Outfit, when you screwed up, you got planted. End of story. It wasn't like they handed you a pink slip and you went to work for another crew. You were done. That is, unless you used a tactic that was a favorite with America's corporate set, the old CYA routine — cover your ass and blame whatever went wrong on the other guy."
 "Any time you hear the FBI use the words witness protection, you can bet you've got a problem."
 "In 1981 the Chicago Outfit was out of control. Tocco's crew had taken killing to a whole new level, so that whacking a guy didn't mean anything anymore. Forget finesse or discretion. Under cover of night or in broad daylight, it didn't matter. If they had a job to do, they did it. Guys were dropping like flies, the chop shop owners were still taking a beating, and the police departments were starting to look more like Outfit crews than crime fighters. Politicians like Doc Rust's old friend Pat Marcy, from Chicago's First Ward, were operating more like godfathers than elected officials. And perhaps not coincidentally, cocaine was everywhere. A lot of the younger Outfit guys were dealing it--and doing it. They were living in the fast lane and dying there, too. Nightlife in Chicago meant disco bars, free sex, and fast highs. And if you were an Outfit guy, a fast buck."

Further reading

References

Sources
Cooley, Robert and Hillel Levin. When Corruption Was King: How I Helped the Mob Rule Chicago, Then Brought the Outfit Down. New York: Caroll & graf Publishers, 2004. 
Corbitt, Michael and Sam Giancana. Double Deal: The Inside Story of Murder, Unbridled Corruption, and the Cop Who Was a Mobster. New York: HarperCollins Publishing, 2003.

External links
Jailed Suburban Chief Reveals How He Became a Mobster 
Chicago Sun-Times: Crooked cop's mob ties  by Robert Manor
United States of America v. Alan Masters, Michael J. Corbitt and James D. Keating
Michael Corbitt's Testimony 

1944 births
2004 deaths
Chicago Outfit mobsters
American gangsters of Irish descent
American gangsters
American police officers convicted of murder
Organized crime memoirists
People from Willow Springs, Illinois